HD 92589 (HR 4183) is a double star in the constellation Antlia. The system has a combined apparent magnitude of 6.39, placing it near the limit of naked eye visibility. This indicates that it is drifting away from the Solar System.

The system has a composite stellar classification of G8/K0 III + F/G. This indicates that the primary spectrum intermediate between a G8 and K0 giant star while the companion is probably a F-type or G-type star. Both stars take  to orbit each other.

At present the visible component has 2.3 times the mass of the Sun but has expanded to 13.07 times its girth.

References

G-type giants
K-type giants
Antlia
092589
Double stars
4183
052273
Durchmusterung objects